Twelve Small Steps, One Giant Disappointment is the third studio album from the American indie rock band, Bad Astronaut. It was released in November, 2006, on Fat Wreck Chords and follows Houston: We Have a Drinking Problem from 2002 and Acrophobe from Feb 2001 on Honest Don's. Due to the death of drummer Derrick Plourde, it is Bad Astronaut's final album. It is also the only Bad Astronaut release to feature all original material.

The song "Violet" was originally released by Joey Cape as a solo acoustic track on his split LP with No Use for a Name singer Tony Sly. "Minus" was also previously released as a Cape solo track on the Fat Wreck Chords compilation PROTECT: A Benefit for the National Association to Protect Children.

Track listing
"Good Morning Night" – 3:53
"Ghostwrite" – 3:56		
"Beat" – 5:31 		
"Stillwater, California" – 4:01 		
"One Giant Disappointment" – 2:59
"Minus" – 3:08
"Best Western" – 3:56
"San Francisco Serenade" – 4:33 		
"Autocare" – 4:01
"Violet" – 1:59
"Go Humans" – 1:49
"The 'F' Word" – 8:02	
"The Thirteenth Step" – 2:19

Trivia
The song "Ghostwrite" contains several allusions to legendary Southern California punk band T.S.O.L., including the lines "True sounds of liberty/Straining through my voice" and "Posing Weathered Statues."

Credits 
 Joey Cape – lead vocals, bass
 Angus Cooke – cello, percussion, bass, guitar, vocals
 Sean McCue – guitar
 Thomas Flowers – banjo, guitar, mandolin
 Derrick Plourde – drums
 Todd Capps – keyboards
 Jonathan Cox – loops
 Produced and engineered by Angus Cooke, Joey Cape, and Thomas Flowers
 Engineered by Ryan Greene
 Additional Mixing Jamie McMann

External links 
 Fat Wreck Chords album page
 [ Allmusic Guide entry]

Bad Astronaut albums
2006 albums
Fat Wreck Chords albums
Albums produced by Joey Cape